Cell division control protein 42 homolog is a protein that in humans is encoded by the Cdc42 gene. Cdc42 is involved in regulation of the cell cycle. It was originally identified in S. cerevisiae (yeast) as a mediator of cell division, and is now known to influence a variety of signaling events and cellular processes in a variety of organisms from yeast to mammals.

Function 
Human Cdc42 is a small GTPase of the Rho family, which regulates signaling pathways that control diverse cellular functions including cell morphology, cell migration, endocytosis and cell cycle progression. Rho GTPases are central to dynamic actin cytoskeletal assembly and rearrangement that are the basis of cell-cell adhesion and migration. Activated Cdc42 activates by causing conformational changes in p21-activated kinases PAK1 and PAK2, which in turn initiate actin reorganization and regulate cell adhesion, migration, and invasion.

Structure 
Cdc42 is a homodimer with A and B chains. Its total length is 191 amino acids and its theoretical weight is 21.33 kDa. Its sequence domains include a P-loop containing nucleoside triphosphate hydrolase and a small GTP-binding protein domain.

Cdc42 cycles between an active GTP-bound state and an inactive GDP-bound state. This process is regulated by guanine nucleotide exchange factors (GEFs) which promote the exchange of bound GDP for free GTP, GTPase activating proteins (GAPs) which increase GTP hydrolysis activity, and GDP dissociation inhibitors which inhibit the dissociation of the nucleotide from the GTPase.

Role in cancer 
Recently, Cdc42 has been shown to actively assist in cancer progression. Several studies have established the basis for this and hypothesized about the underlying mechanisms.

Cdc42 is overexpressed in non-small cell lung cancer, colorectal adenocarcinoma, melanoma, breast cancer, and testicular cancer. Elevated levels of the protein have been correlated with negative patient survival. Cdc42 has also been shown to be required for both G1-S phase progression and mitosis, and it also modulates the transcription factors SRF, STAT3, and NFkB. It has been hypothesized that targeting Cdc42 in conjunction with chemotherapy may be an effective cancer treatment strategy.

In one study studying the role of Cdc42 in cervical cancer, immunohistochemistry was used to detect Cdc42 expression in three types of tissues: normal cervical tissues, cervical intraepithelial neoplasia (CIN) I or below, CIN II or above, and cervical cancer tissues. Cdc42 expression was gradually increased showing significant difference and was significantly higher in HeLa cells than in regular cells. The migration ability of HeLa cells transfected with Cdc42 was higher than that of non-transfected cells. It was proposed that the overexpression of Cdc42 can promote filopodia formation in HeLa cells. Cdc42 overexpression significantly improved the ability of cervical cancer cells to migrate, possibly due to improved pseudopodia formation.

Another study found that Cdc42 drives the process of initiating a metastatic tumor in a new tissue by promoting the expression of β1 integrin, an adhesion receptor known to be involved in metastasis. Levels of β1 integrin were reduced in Cdc42-deficient cells. β1 integrin is important for adhesion to the extracellular matrix, and could be important for the initial attachment to endothelial cells as well. Knocking down β1 integrin inhibited cancer cell migration, whereas overexpressing the integrin in Cdc42-deficient cells restored endothelial invasion. Cdc42 promoted β1 integrin expression by activating a transcription factor called SRF. A continually active form of the transcription factor was also capable of restoring endothelial insertion to cancer cells lacking Cdc42.

Normal cancer cells and Cdc42-deficient cancer cells have also been compared in vivo. When both types of cells were injected into mouse tail veins, control cells spread out more on the vessel endothelium within minutes, suggesting that Cdc42 assists in cell migration. After six weeks, the control cells had generated more metastases than the Cdc42-deficient cells. Invading cancer cells send out protrusions that reach down between neighboring endothelial cells to contact the underlying basement membrane. The cancer cells then spread out on this extracellular matrix so that the endothelial cells retract, and allow the invaders to insert themselves between them. In the absence of Cdc42, cancer cells failed to spread out on the basement membrane, and Cdc42-deficient cells showed reduced adhesion to extracellular matrix-coated coverslips. Cdc42 therefore promotes the attachment of cancer cells to both endothelial cells and the underlying basement membrane during transendothelial migration.

The small molecular inhibitor AZA197 has been used to inhibit Cdc42 in the treatment of KRAS mutant colorectal cancers. There was evidence that Cdc42 inhibition by AZA197 treatment suppresses proliferative and pro-survival signaling pathways via PAK1-ERK signaling and reduces colon cancer cell migration and invasion. In mice, systemic AZA197 treatment in vivo reduced primary tumor growth and prolonged survival. Therapy targeting Rho GTPase Cdc42 signaling pathways may be effective for treatment of patients with advanced colon cancer overexpressing Cdc42, and particularly those with KRAS-mutant disease.

Takenouchi-Kosaki syndrome 
Mutations in the CDC42 gene is responsible for the Takenouchi-Kosaki syndrome, an autosomal-dominant complex congenital developmental disorder, whose symptoms include thrombocytopenia. Alleic variant that are associated with the syndrome include mutations in the CDC42 gene that are expressed at the protein level as Ile21Thr, Tyr64Cys, Arg66Gly, Cys81Phe, Ser83Pro, or Glu171Lys.

Interactions 

CDC42 has been shown to interact with:

 ARHGAP1,
 ARHGDIA,
 BAIAP2,
 BNIP2,
 BNIPL,
 CDC42EP2,
 CDC42EP3,
 ERRFI1,
 GDI1,
 IQGAP1,
 IQGAP2,
 ITSN1,
 MAP3K10,
 MAP3K11,
 PAK1,
 PAK2,
 PAK4.
 PAK7,
 PARD6A,
 PARD6B,
 Phospholipase D1,
 RICS
 TRIP10,
 WASL, 
 Wiskott-Aldrich syndrome protein,

References

External links 

 
CDC42 Info with links in the Cell Migration Gateway